Ubiquinol-cytochrome c reductase, complex III subunit VII, 9.5kDa is a protein that in humans is encoded by the UQCRQ gene. This ubiqinone-binding protein is a subunit of mitochondrial Complex III in the electron transport chain. A mutation in the UQCRQ gene has been shown to cause severe neurological disorders. Infection by Trypanosoma cruzi can cause oxidative modification of this protein in cardiac muscle tissue.

Structure 
The UQCRQ gene is located on the q arm of chromosome 5 in position 31.1 and spans 2,217 base pairs. The gene produces a  9.9 kDa protein composed of 82 amino acids. This protein is transmembranous, with more mass on the matrix side of the membrane.

Function 
This gene encodes a ubiquinone-binding protein of low molecular mass. It is a small core-associated protein and a subunit of ubiquinol-cytochrome c reductase complex III, which is part of the mitochondrial respiratory chain.

Clinical significance 
Variants of UQCRQ have been associated with complex III deficiency. One set of twenty consanguineous cases of a Ser45Phe mutation in the UQCRQ gene, and a different homozygous 4-bp deletion at p. 338-341, have been linked to this disease. In an inbred Israeli Bedouin family, the mutations, inherited in an autosomal recessive pattern, displayed the phenotype of mitochondrial Complex III deficiency, nuclear type 4, accompanied by severe neurological symptoms. Other symptoms of complex III deficiency linked to these mutations have included hypoglycemia, lactic acidosis, and hypotonia.

In another study of cardiac muscle tissue in individuals infected by Trypanosoma cruzi, an oxidative modification of the UQCRQ subunit was present, along with oxidative modification of subunits UQCRC1 and UQCRC2 of the same core complex and UQCRH and CYC1 of the neighboring subcomplex.

Interactions 
The protein encoded by UQCRQ has protein-protein interactions with UQCRC1, OPTN, ERCC8, GRINL1A, Dctn1, K8.1, XRCC3, PML, RAB7A, HNRNPA1L2, CDC73, NLRP3, HAUS2, TMEM248, and GOLT1B.

References

Further reading